Jonathan "Jon" Ekerold (born 8 October 1946) is a South African former professional Grand Prix motorcycle road racer.

Born in Johannesburg, South Africa, Ekerold is one of the few racers in the modern era to have won a world championship as a privateer without the benefit of a motorcycle manufacturer's support when he defeated Kawasaki factory racing team rider Anton Mang for the 1980 350cc Grand Prix road racing world championship. Ekerold rode a self-modified Yamaha TZ350 engine in a Bimota chassis during his championship season. He also won the Ulster Grand Prix once and finished second at the Isle of Man TT twice.

Motorcycle Grand Prix results

(key) (Races in bold indicate pole position; races in italics indicate fastest lap)

References

External links
 Jon Ekerold career profile at IOMTT.com
 Jon Ekerold article at realroadracing.com

1946 births
Living people
Sportspeople from Johannesburg
South African motorcycle racers
250cc World Championship riders
350cc World Championship riders
500cc World Championship riders
Isle of Man TT riders
350cc World Riders' Champions